The 2009 Adelaide Thunderbirds season saw Adelaide Thunderbirds compete in the 2009 ANZ Championship. After winning ten games, Thunderbirds finished third, behind Melbourne Vixens and Waikato Bay of Plenty Magic, during the regular season.  They subsequently defeated Southern Steel in the minor semi-final and Magic in the preliminary final before losing to Vixens in the grand final.

Players

Player movements

2009 roster

Pre-season
In March 2009, Adelaide Thunderbirds played in the 2009 SOPA Cup, hosted by Netball New South Wales at the Sydney Olympic Park Sports Centre. Thunderbirds finished second in the tournament behind New South Wales Swifts.

Regular season

Fixtures and results
Round 1
 
Round 2

Round 3
 
Round 4

Round 5

Round 6

Round 7
Adelaide Thunderbirds received a bye.
Round 8

Round 9

Round 10

Round 11

Round 12

Round 13

Round 14

Final table

Playoffs

Minor semi-final

Preliminary final

Grand final

Award winners

Australian Netball Awards

References

Adelaide Thunderbirds seasons
Adelaide Thunderbirds